Emmanuel Coquelet (born 27 February 1975) is a retired French football striker.

He was voted Luxembourgish Footballer of the Year in 2007–08, also becoming top goalscorer in the same year.

References

1975 births
Living people
French footballers
Valenciennes FC players
Lille OSC players
Amiens SC players
Stade de Reims players
R.E. Virton players
K.S.V. Roeselare players
R.A.E.C. Mons players
F91 Dudelange players
Association football forwards
Ligue 2 players
Belgian Pro League players
French expatriate footballers
Expatriate footballers in Belgium
French expatriate sportspeople in Belgium
Expatriate footballers in Luxembourg
French expatriate sportspeople in Luxembourg